Peter Gosse (born 6 October 1938 in Leipzig) is a German poet, prose author and essayist.

Life
Peter Gosse  first completed a study of high frequency technology in Moscow.  After an occupation as an engineer, he worked as a freelance writer in East Germany from 1968.  Since 1985 he has been a lecturer of poetry at the German Institute for Literature in Leipzig, where he became the commissioned Director in 1993.  Afterwards, he became a guest Professor in the USA.  Peter Gosse is a member of the International PEN and since 2008, deputy President of the Sächsischen Akademie der Künste (Saxon Academy of the Arts).

Works

Awards
 Heinrich Heine prize of the Ministry for culture of the GDR 1985
 Heinrich Mann Prize of the Academy of Arts, Berlin 1991

1938 births
Living people
Writers from Leipzig
German poets
20th-century German novelists
21st-century German novelists
German essayists
East German writers
Writers from Saxony
Heinrich Mann Prize winners
German male essayists
German male poets
German male novelists
20th-century essayists
21st-century essayists
20th-century German male writers
21st-century German male writers